Muhammad ibn Maslamah al-Ansari (588 or 591 –  663 or 666) was a companion of the Islamic prophet Muhammad. He was known as "The Knight of Allah's Prophet". His kunya was Abu Abdullah or Abu Abd al Rahman. Ibn Maslamah embraced Islam before the Hijrah of Muhammad and his followers. Ibn Maslamah witnessed all the battles except for the expedition of Tabuk, as he was appointed as deputy governor of Medina during the campaign.

During the time of the Rashidun Caliphate, Ibn Maslamah participated in the Muslim conquest of Egypt under Zubayr ibn al-Awwam. For the rest of Caliph Umar's reign, Ibn Maslamah was put in charge as the personal agent of Umar to oversee his governors.

Biography
Muhammad ibn Maslamah was born in Medina c. 588 or c. 591 as a member of the Aws tribe. According to Ibn Athir in Usd al-ghabah fi marifat al-Saḥabah and Ibn Sa'd in his Tabaqat al Kabir, his full Nisba was  Muhammad ibn Maslamah ibn Khalid ibn Adiy ibn Majda'a ibn Harith al-Khazraj ibn Amr ibn Malik Al-Awsi, While ad-Dhahabi offering slightly different and shorter lineage of: Muhammad ibn Maslamah ibn Salamah bin Khalid bin Adiy bin Majda’a ibn Abu Sa'id al-Awsi. his mother was Umm Sahm Khulayda bint Abi Ubayda from the Sa'ida clan.

Campaign under Muhammad 

Ibn Maslama embraced Islam at the hands of Mus'ab ibn Umayr before his fellow Aus clansmen Sa'd ibn Mu'adh and Usaid Bin Hudair, and before Muhammad's and Meccan Muslims immigration to Medina around the year of 621-622 AD. After the Meccans arrived in Medina, the inhabitants of Medina were immediately instructed by Muhammad to bond brotherhood with the Meccans, with Ibn Maslama being  paired with Abu Ubaidah ibn al-Jarrah. the reason of his pairing with Abu Ubaidah were due to Muhammad's observance that Ibn Maslamah's character and his temperament, along with personal tastes and a similar attitude with Abu Ubaydah.

Thus, Hereafter the arrival of Muslims of Mecca, Ibn Maslamah served in various military campaigns, where the first pitched battle was fought at the Battle of Badr in March 624. Later, when the Muslims defeated the Qaynuqa tribe in April, Ibn Maslamah supervised their expulsion from Medina and the seizure of their possessions. Muhammad awarded him a coat of mail. In the same year, approximately in the month of September, Ibn Maslama was sent by Muhammad along with some of his kinsmen and allied tribe of Aws on a mission to assassinate Ka'b ibn al-Ashraf, a Jewish man who would recite defamatory poetry about Muhammad and also made explicit poems about Muslim women. Ibn Maslamah pretended to Ka'b that he didn't support Muhammad and would side with Ka'b against him, on the condition that Ka'b would give him a camel load or two of food as a loan. Ka'b wanted something in return and Ibn Maslamah offered to leave his weapons with him as collateral. Ka'b then came out to meet him and a few others during night time and after the men smelled his head for perfume, they killed him. While Ibn Maslamah and his colleagues managed to escape undetected within the night, the tribes of Ka'b learned about the death of Ka'b the next day after they found the corpse of Ka'b on the ground.

In April 625, the Muslims were engaged in the Battle of Uhud against Quraysh who were under Abu Sufyan ibn Harb. Ibn Maslamah was put in charge of fifty men that were  tasked with patrolling the camp at night time before the battle. In this battle, the Muslims suffered heavy losses from the unexpected flanking from behind by Khalid ibn al-Walid. As the Muslims retreated, Ibn Maslamah was one of few soldiers who stood by Muhammad. Later, In August 625 Ibn Maslamah brought the message to the Jewish tribe of Banu Nadir that Muhammad wanted to expel them. This act by Ibn Maslama shocked Nadir tribesmen, as they did not think an Aws clansmen would dare to threaten them like that. Later, when the Nadir tribe surrendered to Muhammad and were expelled from Medina, it was Ibn Maslamah who supervised their exit and collected all their confiscated property and weapons.

In the next year, 626, in between August and September, Ibn Maslamah was involved with the cattle-raid on Invasion of Dumatul Jandal, where he was the only Muslim who captured a human prisoner; the other raiders only brought cattle and camels. However, the captive of this expedition who has been brought by Ibn Maslamah turned out to be an important Arab named Thumamah ibn Uthal, chieftain of Banu Hanifa clan that was inhabiting Al-Yamama Najd, Central Arabia. Thumamah was later freed by Muhammad without any ransom, which caused the impressed Thumamah to embrace Islam and urged his followers of Hanifa to embrace Islam. The conversion of Thumamah had significant political impact on Muslim Medina for two reasons: 
 Thumamah clan, Banu Hanifa were an agricultural community in Central Arabia and important suppliers of wheat to many tribes across the Arabian desert. After embracing Islam, Thumamah boycotted the Quraysh in Mecca, which caused the Quraysh to cease the aggression towards Medinan Muslims to some extent.
 Later during Apostate rebellions in the era of Abu Bakr Rashidun Caliphate, Thumamah's branch of Banu Hanifa retracted themselves from Musaylimah's faction, who also hailed from Banu Hanifa. The branch instead began assisting the caliphate by providing significant numbers of manpower of warriors to fight under Khalid ibn al-Walid, who also had converted to Islam and fought under the caliphate in the Battle of Yamama.

The next major battle Ibn Maslamah participated in was the Battle of the Trench which occurred in the spring of 627, when the coalitions of Quraysh, Ghatafan, and other smaller tribes numbered to 10,000, besieged Medina. Ibn Maslamah stood as guard at Muhammad's tent by night. Then, the following day after the besiegers of Medina retreated, Ibn Maslamah participated in the punitive siege operation against another Jewish tribe in Medina, the Qurayza tribe who betrayed Medina and sided with the coalition army in the Battle of the Trench. As the Qurayza tribesmen surrendered, Ibn Maslamah was the one who tied the prisoners' wrists. Ibn Maslamah was tasked to guard the Jewish tribe captives who were to be executed. A Jew named 'Amr ibn Suda snuck past the guard during the night, slipped out of Medina and was never seen again. Ibn Maslamah told Muhammad that he had deliberately allowed 'Amr to escape because he had not participated in the treachery of the Qurayza. Muhammad accepted this story and said that God had delivered 'Amr because of his faithfulness. When the Qurayza prisoners were being sold, Ibn Maslamah bought a woman and her two sons for 45 coins of dinar. These coins were acquired by Ibn Maslamah when he was awarded three portions of the spoils of war, since the Fiqh ruling in Islam allowed the horsemens for bigger spoils from Infantry, and Ibn Maslamah fought in this siege on his horse.

Ibn Maslamah led 30 horsemen on the raid to al-Qurata in June 627. They marched by night and hid by day. At al-Sharaba they attacked the Bakr clan of the Kilab tribe and killed ten of them. Then they drove the cattle, 150 camels and 3000 sheep back to Medina. The following month Muhammad sent him with ten men to Ghatafan territory in Dhu’l-Qassa. Ibn Maslamah and his men were ambushed in the night while they ereew sleeping. When the enemy started shooting arrows, Ibn Maslamah was the first to awaken and warned his men to return fire with their own arrows. The Bedouins threw spears and killed three of them; the Muslims killed one; then the ambushers killed seven more. Ibn Maslamah fell with a wounded ankle although he managed to survive and escape, as the enemies stripped the corpses and departed. Later, a Muslim happened to pass the site, and on finding Ibn Maslamah alive, he gave him food and water and transported him back to Medina. Later, Ibn Maslama was also present at the al-Muraysi in January 628.

During the Pledge of the Tree, Ibn Maslamah was among the twenty horsemen who were sent as an advance guard to Hudaybiyyah and he was on the night-watch roster. One night the Quraysh sent fifty men to the Muslim camp. Ibn Maslamah managed to capture them and bring them to Muhammad. According to one tradition, he was later a witness to the Treaty of Hudaybiyyah; but an alternative tradition asserts that the witness was his brother Mahmud.

Siege of Khaybar  

At the Battle of Khaybar in May/July 628, it was Ibn Maslamah who located the best site for the Muslim camp. On the first day of the battle his brother Mahmud was fatally injured while he was sitting in the shade of Fort Na'im. Inside the fortress, the Jewish warrior Marhab threw down a millstone, which landed on Mahmud's head. It took Mahmud three days to die, during this time, Ibn Maslamah promised to take care of his brother's daughters.

On the same day, Ibn Maslamah avenged his brother by killing his murderer, a Jewish warrior named Marhab, in a vicious duel which was so intense to the point that palm trees within the garden outside the fortress wall, were chopped-off completely.
The battle ended with Ibn Maslamah managing to chop off one of Marhab's legs. However, before Ibn Maslamah delivered the killing blow. he was intercepted by Ali who passed by and cut off Marhab's head. This entitled Ali to take the booty which prompted Ibn Maslamah to argue the claims of Ali to Muhammad, and after they referred their dispute to him, he granted Marhab's sword, shield, cap and helmet to Ibn Maslamah. Later, Ibn Maslamah also killed another Jewish champion named Yusayr and also participated in the squad of those who shielded Muhammad when they besieged the fortress of al-Saab ibn Muadh. After the battle, Kinana ibn al-Rabi was tortured by Zubayr ibn al-Awwam in the hope that he would reveal where he had hidden the treasure of the Abu'l-Huqayq clan. When Kinana was no longer able to speak, Muhammad ordered al-Zubayr to hand him over to Ibn Maslamah. Ibn Maslamah was allowed to cut off Kinana's head.

Career until death of Muhammad  
After all of eight fortresses in Khaybar were subdued, Ibn Maslamah and the Muslim forces marched again and passed the Jewish tribe of Wadi al-Qura, which they fought on the basis that until either surrendered. The Muslims stayed for a while dividing the spoils of war, Ibn Maslamah was awarded one share in Wadi al-Qura.

On The first pilgrimage of 629, Muhammad sent ahead of him a hundred horsemen, led by Ibn Maslamah, which frightened the Quraysh, although Muhammad reassured them that he had no military intentions. Ibn Maslamah also participated in the Conquest of Mecca in January 630. When Muhammad circumambulated the Kaaba on his camel al-Qaswa, just before destroying its idols, Ibn Maslamah was holding the camel's reins. It is recorded that Ibn Maslamah was ordered to be in all military campaigns by Muhammad, with the exception of  Expedition of Tabuk, for on that occasion Muhammad appointed him as the governor of Medina.

Life during Rashidun Caliphate 

During the Caliphate Ibn Maslamah worked as a tax-collector, bringing in zakat that was due from the Ashja tribe which was a subtribe of Ghatafan.

In 638, Caliph Umar sent Ibn Maslamah to the newly founded settlement of Kufa. Sa'd ibn Abi Waqqas, hero of Battle of al-Qadisiyyah and Siege of Ctesiphon (637), had built a public citadel next door to his own house. The noise from the nearby market was so deafening that Saad had built a locked gate into the citadel, which prompted the Caliph to sent Ibn Maslamah to  destroy the gate, which he did by setting fire to it. He refused all of Sa'd's offers of hospitality, but handed him a letter from Umar reminding him that the citadel should be available to the public and suggesting that he move his house. Saad didn't believe in the letter and denied that Umar would make such remarks. Ibn Maslamah did not have nough supplies for his homeward journey. Later, in 642 Ibn Maslamah continued his job as the Caliph's personal overseer, investigating any complaints across the caliphate realm. Until he found more complaints against Sa'd in Kufa, then Ibn Maslamah was sent to back Kufa to investigate. He visited all the local mosques and heard all the complaints in public. Nearly everyone expressed satisfaction with Saad's conduct as governor; but eventually there was an accusation that he did not lead the prayers correctly and spent too much time hunting. Ibn Maslamah took Sa'd and his accusers back to Umar, which later led to Sa'd being proven innocent while the accuser was only spreading rumors, although Umar kept on replacing Sa'd as governor.

Later, after the ascension of Uthman as caliph, Ibn Maslamah continued to act as inspector under Uthman. In 655 Uthman sent him to Kufa to investigate certain complaints; but Ibn Maslamah reported back that he had found nothing amiss.

During the Muslim conquest of Egypt, the Rashidun commander, Amr ibn al-Aas requested reinforcements during his expedition to Egypt, Ibn Maslamah was one of those sent by Umar at the head of a detachment of a thousand men., It was recorded by Al-Dhahabi that during the Siege of the Babylon Fortress, Ibn Maslamah was one of the soldiers who was chosen by Zubayr ibn al-Awwam to form a small team who would accompany Zubayr in his daring act of personally climbing the wall of Babylon Fortress and forcing their way towards the gate and open it for Muslim army.

During the turmoil in Medina from Egyptians and Iraqis against caliph Uthman, Ibn Maslamah remained a supporter of Uthman. When Uthman warned from the pulpit that the Egyptian rebels had been cursed by Muhammad, Ibn Maslamah stood up and testified he also heard from Muhammad himself regarding the Hadith which was being narrated by Uthman at the pulpit, that those dissidents who were prophesied before, will cause trouble, which the chroniclers thought particularly during this time . Uthman later sent Ibn Maslamah along with Ali to lead a delegation to order the Egyptian dissidents out of Medina. When unrest continued, Ibn Maslamah set out with fifty cavalry to negotiate with the Egyptians. He entered their leaders' tent and stressed Uthman's rights and how they had bound themselves to his leadership in their oath of allegiance. He warned them of the dangers of civil war and of what might happen if Uthman were killed. Then he offered himself as a guarantor that Uthman would meet the Egyptians' demands. One of them asked the possibility of Uthman's change of opinion, which Ibn Maslamah replied by saying "if so, then it is up to them." Ibn Maslamah then returned to the private chamber of the Caliph and warned him to escape with his life, as he thought the dissidents will kill Uthman. Then Uthman replied that he will not change or escape from the face of those dissidents. As the Egyptians returned to Medina. Uthman asked for Ibn Maslamah's advice, Ibn Maslamah replied that the Egyptian dissidents have malice intention. Uthman told him to send the Egyptians away again, However Ibn Maslamah replied, that he would not do such things as he promised them that the Caliph will stop doing certain things, which prompted Uthman to pray. Soon afterwards the Egyptians besieged his house. The Egyptians approached Ibn Maslamah directly to advise him of the discovery of a letter in which Uthman had ordered various officials to be flogged. Ibn Maslamah accompanied Ali to an audience with Uthman, where Ali voiced this allegation. Uthman denied all knowledge of the letter; Ibn Maslamah and Ali believed him and decided that it must have been forged by Marwan. Ali told Uthman that he must repeat his denial in the hearing of the Egyptians. The Egyptians entered and repeated all their complaints, and Uthman repeated his denial of the letter. The Egyptians countered that if he was so incompetent that it was possible for someone to forge letters by appropriating his personal scribe, seal, slave and camel, then he ought to abdicate anyway. Uthman refused to abdicate the office to which God had appointed him, and the interview became loud. Ibn Maslamah and Ali managed to usher them out of Uthman's presence before there was any physical violence, but the siege of Uthman's house continued until the caliph was murdered.

After Uthman was assassinated, Ibn Maslamah was one of the few who did not give allegiance to Ali. A messenger from Basra was inciting some troubles with Usama ibn Zayd regarding the pledge of allegiance to Ali as Caliph, which prompted some of Ali's supporters to attack Usama, and Ibn Maslamah was among those who jumped up to protect him. Suhayb ar-Rumi managed to calm down the immediate situation, but the reports of half-hearted support for Ali returned both to him and to his opponents. During the period of strife, Subayaa ibn Husayn al-Thaalabi saw a tent set up by a well in the desert. He was told that it belonged to Muhammad ibn Maslamah, who was by then an old man. Subayaa asked Ibn Maslamah why he was living there. Ibn Maslamah replied that he had left Medina because he want to avoid the civil war within the caliphate.

Death 
Muhammad ibn Maslamah died in Medina in May/June 663 or April/May 666 aged about 75. It was reported by Ibn Sa'd, Ibn Maslama was murdered by a citizen of Jordan, who resented Ibn Maslamah's neutrality and pacifism during the civil war.

Marwan ibn Hakam, who was a cousin of Uthman and Mu'awiya I lead his funeral prayer. According to another record, It was Mu'awiya who led the funeral prayer.

Hadith & personal characteristic 
Ibn Maslamah was described as a physically tall and stout man, with dark skin and a bald head.

As Ibn Maslamah mostly fought as a cavalry trooper, it is recorded by Al-Waqidi that the horse of Ibn Maslamah was named Dhu al-Limma.

It is said that Ibn Maslamah was deemed by Muhammad as in having a similar character and attitude with Abu Ubayda ibn al-Jarrah, a senior Muhajirun Sahaba. Ibn Maslamah was also deemed as a person of few words and never complained when given difficult tasks, such as the assassination of Jewish chieftain Ka'b ibn Ashraf. This quality, according to Nagendra Kumar Singh, was the reason why Umar trusted Ibn Maslamah as his personal agent to overseeing the governors under Umar

He encouraged his children to ask him about Muhammad's military expeditions. He said he knew about all of them first-hand, except for Tabuk, which he had heard about directly from its participants.

He carved a sword out of wood and put it on a bowl hung up in his house "in order to alarm the anxious".

Muhammad had given Ibn Maslamah a sword, saying, "Fight the idolators with it when they fight. When you see the Muslims facing one another, take it to Uhud and strike it until it breaks. Then sit in your house until it ends." When the civil war broke out, Ibn Maslamah took the sword that Muhammad had given him and broke it.

When Abu Bakr raised the legal question of the inheritance due to a grandmother, Ibn Maslamah testified that Muhammad had allocated her one-sixth of the estate.

After the ascension of Umar as Caliph, Umar once asked about the blood-money required for the killing of an unborn child by assaulting its mother. Ibn Maslamah testified that Muhammad had set the price at "a high-quality slave" of either gender.

During the reign of Umar as Caliph, Ibn Maslamah was involved in a dispute with a neighbour, al-Dahhak ibn Khalifa, who wanted to divert a stream through Ibn Maslama's property. Ibn Maslama refused permission even when Dahhak reminded him that it could not harm him and he would have unlimited rights to take the water. Dahhak referred the case to Umar, and Ibn Maslamah repeated to the Caliph that he would not allow it. In the end, Umar gave a verdict in favor of Dahhak, and the stream was diverted as Dahhak had wished.

Family
Ibn Maslamah had ten sons and six daughters by seven different women.

 Umm Amr bint Salama of the Abdul-Ashhal clan of the Aws. Her brother was present at the Second pledge at al-Aqabah, and she was one of the women who gave allegiance to Muhammad.
 Abdulrahman
 Umm Isa
 Umm al-Harith
 Amra bint Masud of the Zafar clan of the Aws. She and her daughter, together with her mother, sister and niece, were among the first women in Medina who gave allegiance to Muhammad.
 Abdullah
 Umm Ahmad
 Qutayla bint al-Husayn of the Murra branch of the Qays ibn Aylan tribe.
 Saad
 Jaafar
 Umm Zayd
 Zahra bint Ammar of the Murra branch of the Qays ibn Aylan tribe.
 Umar
 Wives from the Atba clan of the Kalb tribe.
 Anas
 Amra
 Concubines
 Qays
 Zayd
 Muhammad
 Another concubine.
 Mahmud
 Hafsa

See also
Sunni view of the Sahaba
List of battles of Muhammad

References

Companions of the Prophet
6th-century births
660s deaths
Year of birth uncertain
Year of death uncertain
Ansar (Islam)